Pierre Risch, born in 1943 in Paris, is a painter, engraver, lithographer, sculptor, and French designer.

Formation 
From 1959 to 1960, he studied at the "École supérieure des Arts Décoratifs" in Strasbourg.

In 1964 he moved to Montmartre where he met one of his Masters Jean-Louis Viard from which he took evening classes at the city of Paris, street Lepic, from 1965 to 1970.
The two men will be bond by friendship and respect until the death of Jean-Louis Viard in 2009.

In 1966, he joined a group of painters in Paris to learn all the traditional art of print : the etching, the aquatint, the dry point, and also the lithography and screen printing.

He participated from 1968 to 1970 at different exhibitions in Paris at the Autumn Salon, at Salon des artistes français at Salon des Independants, Societe des Artistes Independants.

He won a first prize of young painter in Geneva, Switzerland in 1970.

Pierre Risch has received the title of Chevalier des Arts et des Lettres.

Techniques 
Since 1960, Pierre Risch invests himself in technical research and innovation. This will be one of his major artistic commitment.

He falls in love with the techniques of watercolor and pastel so unfairly dismissed at that time and decides to give them back their true worth.

He also practices the traditional art of engraving on copper, and lithograph on limestone .

Watercolor 
In the years 60 – 70, watercolor often remains preparatory work of the final oil.
So he decides to assert the watercolor's technique as full totally abandoning painting in oil.
The artist works in series ( girls, chairs, balloons...) Over the years and gallery exhibitions its willingness and 
determination to bear fruits.

Early 1970s, Pierre Risch develops a technique of watercolor to fully wet the paper sponge and away a product for
screen painting, ( drawing gum ) to preserve the white of the paper, to keep at the watercolor is essential quality of transparency, subtlety and not to have the often seen bad effect to have put gouache .
He paints watercolors very large formats, mainly landscapes, poetic character to return in the best transparencies and lighting.
His watercolors are made on site during various trips, ( Italy, Greece, Spain, Brittany, Le Crotoy Baie of Somme, Provence...).

"With Risch, seduction comes first, in his art of reproducing transparency, fluidity, and the most subtle,
the most refined shades of light he consequently creates an intense emotional appeal.",
Emmanuel Robles, writer 1914 – 1995 – member of the Academy Goncourt.

Extract from the catalogue of the exhibition " Pierre Risch, Watercolors : retrospective 1977–1987", 
and the speech at the opening of the exhibition " A gallery, A painter, 10 years of friendship – retrospective Watercolors 1977 – 1987", 
Rue de Seine, Gallery Candillier, Paris.

Pastel 
After being practiced by the greatest masters in the eighteenth and nineteenth century, pastel fell into disuse. 
 
In 1970, in collaboration with JM Paillard et Lambertye manufacturers, Pierre Risch working on the development of new shades of dry pastels and new media.
With determination the artist organizes a series of didactic and popular exhibitions expressing his love for pastel, he then creates the Pastel Passion and Passion Pastel titles which become over the years his imprint and his official professional mark.

At the same time, Pierre Risch is pending a full subject. He works on the revival of the Carnival of Venice with his Venetian friends.  
Humanism which then emerges, will become the central theme of his work.

Galleries, collectors and museums, including the Museum Antoine Lecuyer – Maurice Quentin de La Tour in Saint-Quentin, France, support achievements, focusing the Carnivals and especially the Carnival of Venice, from jazz,
and dance.

"Pierre Risch has focused mainly on work on paper [...] So by a natural process he came to Pastels, guessing the satisfaction that the technique would give him, and wishing too that with his talent, he would give it back its true worth, or at least its own identity and its unique originality.

This is where the artist's worth lies : he is contributing back in favor an endearing technique which is too often thought as minor and which is so little – known.
He shows us convincingly the various possibilities of plastic expressions that it offers artists of our time. Pierre Risch can also prove that pastel is not only synonymous with soft colors. [...]

Pierre Risch has become the painter of Celebrations and color as well as the friend of all the characters of the Italian Comedy who live in his paintings [...] 
With his handwriting where the fathoms all secrets, he translates with surprising mastery, the thousand different shimmers of the rain, of clouds, of mist, or the water sparkling in grey daylight. Therefore, his style reminds us of Impressionists. At other times though, the nervous hatchings have replaced the juxtaposed dabs of paint and they take over the flat tint to render, in a style more akin to frottage, more shimmering, indeed very free and modern, [...] Pierre Risch is also the painter of movement, poses caught on the spot, and feelings expressed with equal spontaneity and truth in every one of his characters [...] 
He then becomes the First French painter who works on the theme of Carnivals : Basle, Binche and mostly Venice that he has followed since 1981 and chosen to be the central core of his work as a pastel artist".

Mrs Christine Debrie, Doctor in history of Art – Curator of the Museum Antoine Lecuyer – Maurice Quentin de La Tour in Saint-Quentin, France.

Extract from the catalogue and the opening speech of the exhibition, retrospective Pierre Risch – Pastels – Carnavals de 1981 à 1987.

Etching 
Pierre Risch also practice the traditional technique of etching on copper in the studio Lacourière-Frélaut, in Montmartre, Paris, famous to have worked with Picasso, for making the well-known "suite Ambroise Vollard." Pierre Risch has created there in particular his triptyque Commedia dell' Arte (1981) collected by the Cabinet des estampes de la bibliothèque nationale de France. It mixes the three techniques of etching, aquatint, eau forte and dry point.

Lithography 
The lithographs by Pierre Risch are using the traditional technique on limestones, the artist works on his own hand press "bête a cornes"  1840.

Sculpture 
The sculptures on iron created by Pierre Risch are the continuity and a natural extension of his work on the jazz, dance, body movement, the human being and societal mechanics.

Solo didactic exhibitions 
 1975 Club du Droit and economie, Paris
 1977 Foundation Paul Ricard, Paris
 1979 Orangerie du Luxembourg, Senat, Paris
 1984 Museum of Chateau of Dourdan, France
 1984 Opening cultural center Boris-Vian, Les Ulis, France
 1987 Retrospective Pierre Risch, carnivals Pastels 1981–1987
 Museum Antoine Lecuyer – Maurice Quentin de La Tour in Saint-Quentin, France
 1988 Cultural Center Abou Dhabi, week of France, exhibition and lectures United Arab Emirates
 1990 French Cultural Center, Oslo, Norway
 1990 French Cultural Center, Stavanger, Norway
 1995 Retrospective Orangerie du Luxembourg, Senat, Paris
 1999 Guest Futuroscope, Poitiers, France
 2010 Retrospective Risch as life, Zug (city), Switzerland

Since 1968 Pierre Risch has been exhibited countless time in France and abroad, (Brussels, Genève, Abu Dhabi, New York City, Tokyo)...

It must be said is in public collections as well as private.

Bibliography 

 Emmanuel Benezit, Dictionnaire des peintres, sculpteurs, dessinateurs et graveurs, tome 11, 1976, 1999,  &  
 Carnaval d'Antan et d'Ailleurs – Cent estampes et peintures de la collection Jean Sebille, International museum of Carnival and Mask of Binche, Belgium, Collection Jean Sebille, 
 Cabinet des Estampes de la Bibliothèque nationale de Paris, France, De Bonnard à Baselitz – Dix ans d'enrichissements du Cabinet des Estampes, 1978 to 1988 ,  
 Pierre Risch, Pastels : Carnivals 1981–1987., ed. Antoine Lecuyer – Pierre Risch, 1987.
 Pierre Risch, Aquarelles : retrospective 1977–1987, ed. Pierre Risch, 1987.
 Pierre Risch, Pastel Passion rétrospective 1995, ed. Pierre Risch – Orangerie du Luxembourg, Senat, Paris.
 Pierre Risch, Pierre Risch – Pastel Passion, tome 1 ed. Pierre Risch – Pastel Passion, 2013, 
 Pierre Risch, Pierre Risch – Swingstreet – sculptures, tome 2 ed. Pierre Risch – Swingstreet, 2015,

Public collections 

 Museum Antoine Lecuyer, Saint-Quentin, France
 Museum of Chateau, Dourdan, France
 Cabinet des estampes de la bibliothèque nationale de France
 National Assembly of France, Paris
 Caisse des depots et consignations, Paris
 Prefecture of Evry, France
 Prefecture of Caen Normandy, France
 Regional contemporary art found, FRAC, Basse-Normandie, France
 School les Amonts, les Ulis, France
 District Home of Janvry, France
 Town hall of des Ulis, France
 Town hall of Dourdan, France
 Town hall of Orsay, France
 Bibliothèque of Orsay, France 
 Airport of Paris-Orly, France
 French cultural Institute of Oslo, Norway
 Cultural Institute Cheik Zayed of Abou Dhabi, United Arab Emirates
 Maison de la France in New York City, NY, USA
 School of Music, City of Risch-Rotkreuz, Switzerland

References

External links 
 Artist's website
 Artist's bibliography

French lithographers
French watercolourists
Pastel artists
1943 births
Living people
Painters from Paris
Chevaliers of the Ordre des Arts et des Lettres
20th-century French painters
20th-century French male artists
French male painters
21st-century French painters
21st-century French male artists
20th-century French printmakers

21st-century French lithographers